Dicercina is a subtribe of metallic wood-boring beetles in the family Buprestidae. There are at least 2 genera and 20 described species in Dicercina.

Genera
These two genera belong to the subtribe Dicercina.
 Dicerca Eschscholtz, 1829
 Lampetis Dejean, 1833

References

Further reading

External links

 

Buprestidae